HMS England was a 42-gun fifth raye purchased in 1693. She served in the Bristol Channel or North Sea. She was sunk by a French squadron in 1695.

Gibraltar was the only named vessel in the Royal Navy.

Construction
She was purchased on 19 August 1693, but is also listed as 'hired' on 5 September 1693.

Commissioned Service
She was commissioned in 1694 Under the command of Captain William Cooper, RN for service in either the North Sea or the Bristol Channel'

Loss
HMS England was taken and sunk by a French Squadron off Cape Clear on 16 February 1695 while defending a home bound convoy from the West Indies. Captain Cooper was killed in the battle.

Citations

References
 Winfield 2009, British Warships in the Age of Sail (1603 – 1714), by Rif Winfield, published by Seaforth Publishing, England © 2009, EPUB , Chapter 6, The Sixth Rates, Vessels acquired from 2 May 1660, Gibraltar Group, Gibraltar
 Colledge, Ships of the Royal Navy, by J.J. Colledge, revised and updated by Lt Cdr Ben Warlow and Steve Bush, published by Seaforth Publishing, Barnsley, Great Britain, © 2020, EPUB , (EPUB), Section G (Gibraltar)

 

Frigates of the Royal Navy
Naval ships of the United Kingdom
1690s ships